William Barnwell House is a house in Beaufort, South Carolina. It may be included in the Beaufort Historic District, a National Historic Landmark.

It was individually listed on the National Register of Historic Places in 1971.

References

Houses on the National Register of Historic Places in South Carolina
National Register of Historic Places in Beaufort County, South Carolina
Houses in Beaufort, South Carolina